Campgaw may refer to the following in the U.S. state of New Jersey:

Campgaw, New Jersey, an unincorporated community in Franklin Lakes, Bergen County
Campgaw Mountain, the northernmost ridge of the volcanically formed Watchung Mountains
Campgaw Mountain Reservation, a county park in Bergen County